Tayac may refer to:

People
 Gabrielle Tayac, American historian and curator
 Sébastien Tayac (born 1975), French gymnast
 Turkey Tayac, legally Philip Sheridan Proctor (1895–1978), American activist

Places
 Les Eyzies-de-Tayac-Sireuil, Dordogne, France
 Tayac, Gironde, France

Other
 Château de Tayac, Dordogne, France